Peter Carson Rolston (August 15, 1937 – November 3, 2006) was a United Church minister and political figure in British Columbia. He represented Dewdney in the Legislative Assembly of British Columbia from 1972 to 1975 as a New Democratic Party (NDP) member.

He was ordained a minister in 1965. Rolston was the grandson of Tilly Jean Rolston. He served as minister for St. Andrews United Church in Mission Tahsis/Gold River/Zeballos, Mt. Paul United Church, Kamloops, St. John's Strawberry Hill Church, Delta, British Columbia, and Northwood United Church Surrey, British Columbia. He was defeated when he ran for reelection in 1975. Rolston died at home of lymphoma in 2006.

References 

1937 births
2006 deaths
British Columbia New Democratic Party MLAs
Ministers of the United Church of Canada